Ideopsis vitrea, the Blanchard's wood nymph, is a butterfly of the family Nymphalidae. It is found on Sulawesi, the Moluccas and New Guinea.

Subspecies
Ideopsis vitrea vitrea (West Irian: Arfak Mountains)
Ideopsis vitrea chloris (C. & R. Felder, 1860) (Morotai, Halmahera, Ternate, Bachan, Buru)
Ideopsis vitrea obiana Fruhstorfer, 1910 (Obi)
Ideopsis vitrea inuncta (Butler, 1865) (Gebe Island, Waigeu)
Ideopsis vitrea onina Talbot, 1940 (West Irian: Onin Peninsula)
Ideopsis vitrea serena Joicey & Talbot, 1916 (West Irian: Wandammen Mountains)
Ideopsis vitrea oenopia (C. & R. Felder, 1859) (Sulawesi)
Ideopsis vitrea arachosia Fruhstorfer, 1910 (southern Sulawesi)
Ideopsis vitrea iza Fruhstorfer, 1899 (Sula Islands)
Ideopsis vitrea ribbei Röber, 1887 (Banggai Islands)

Gallery

References

Butterflies described in 1853
Ideopsis